Sir Thomas Marchant Williams, writing name T. Marchant Williams, (1845 – 27 October 1914) was a Welsh nationalist, lawyer, and author.

Williams was one of the first students of Aberystwyth University and later received a BA from the University of London. He  went on to study law and be active in Welsh associations. In early 1900 he was appointed stipendiary magistrate at Merthyr Tydfil.  Williams founded the paper The Nationalist. Among his works are The Welsh Members of Parliament and poems such as The Cloud. He received a knighthood by 1905.

References 

19th-century Welsh writers
20th-century Welsh writers
People associated with Aberystwyth University
Welsh journalists
Welsh-language poets
Welsh lawyers
Welsh nationalists
Welsh novelists
Welsh satirists
Welsh-speaking politicians
1845 births
1914 deaths
19th-century Welsh lawyers
20th-century Welsh lawyers
Stipendiary magistrates (England and Wales)
Knights Bachelor